The Ignorance of Blood is the final novel in Robert Wilson's Javier Falcón series, set in Seville.

References

External links
Official website of novel
Review from The Guardian
Review from The Washington Post
Review from Los Angeles Times

2009 British novels
Novels by Robert Wilson
Novels set in Seville
Novels about terrorism
HarperCollins books
British detective novels